The president of the Regional Government of Andalusia or, simply the president of Andalusia, is the premier of the devolved government of the Spanish autonomous community of Andalusia. The presidency is one of the three branches of the Regional Government of Andalusia (Junta de Andalucía), the institution whereby the government of the community is organized. The other two branches of are the Parliament of Andalusia and the Council of Government.

The current president of Andalusia is Juan Manuel Moreno of the PP, who has held the office since 18 January  2019.

Election
Under Article 118 of the regional Statute of Autonomy, investiture processes to elect the president of the Regional Government of Andalusia require of an absolute majority—more than half the votes cast—to be obtained in the first ballot in the Parliament of Andalusia. If unsuccessful, a new ballot will be held 48 hours later requiring only of a simple majority—more affirmative than negative votes—to succeed. If the proposed candidate is not elected, successive proposals are to be transacted under the same procedure. In the event of the investiture process failing to elect a regional president within a two-month period from the first ballot, the Parliament shall be automatically dissolved and a fresh election called. Before 2007, the Statute provided for these parliamentary deadlocks to be solved by deeming the candidate from the party with the highest number of seats to be automatically elected.

Functions
The functions of the president of the Regional Government of Andalusia come regulated under Article 117 of the regional Statute, with him or her being tasked with the direction and coordination of the activity of the Council of Government, the coordination of regional Administration, the appointment and separation of the regional ministers and the supreme representation of both the autonomous community and the ordinary one of the State in Andalusia. The president is politically accountable to Parliament. may temporarily delegate his or her own executive functions to one of the vice presidents or regional ministers and may propose, on his/her own initiative or at the request of citizens—always in accordance with the provisions of Article 78 of the Statute as well as the State legislation—the holding of popular votes within the autonomous community, on matters of general interest in regional or local matters.

List of officeholders
Governments:

Timeline

References